Pycnopsyche gentilis, the caddisfly, is a species of northern caddisfly in the family Limnephilidae.  It is found in North America.

References

Further reading

 
 
 
 

Integripalpia